The ICC Women's T20 World Cup Qualifier (until 2018, the ICC Women's World Twenty20 Qualifier) is an international cricket tournament that serves as the final step of the qualification process for the Women's T20 World Cup.

The qualifier was held for the first time in 2013, with the top three teams qualifiying for the World Cup. Each subsequent edition has featured eight teams, determined by a combination of international rankings, previous World Cup results, and regional qualifiers, with the top two teams qualifying for the World Cup. Bangladesh have won the tournament on three occasions, winning consecutively in 2018, 2019 and 2022. The first tournament was shared by Pakistan and Sri Lanka when the final ended in a no result, while Ireland won the 2015 tournament. THailand is the only other team to qualify for a World Cup via the qualifier, having finished runner-up to Bangladesh in 2019.

Results

Performance by team
Legend
 – Champions
 – Runners-up
 – Third place
 — Hosts
Q – Qualified for upcoming tournament
§ – Team qualified for tournament, but withdrew or disqualified later
× – Qualified for the World Cup by a different method
Positions that were shared by two teams are underlined

See also
 ICC T20 World Cup Qualifier (men's)
 ICC Women's World Cup Qualifier

References

Qualifier
Women's World Twenty20 Qualifier
Qualification for cricket competitions